Baltic pipeline may refer to:

Balticconnector, a gas pipeline between Estonia and Finland
Baltic Gas Interconnector, a planned gas pipeline between Germany, Denmark and Sweden
Baltic Pipe, a gas pipeline between Denmark and Poland
Baltic Pipeline System, a Russian oil transport system
Nord Stream 1, an operating gas pipeline between Russia and Germany